Jacob Dorsey was a longtime Pittsburgh Police leader, who served as Pittsburgh Police Chief from September 1934 until the Summer of 1936.

Dorsey accused former chief Marshall of corruption in 1934.

See also

 Police chief
 Allegheny County Sheriff
 List of law enforcement agencies in Pennsylvania

References

External links

Chiefs of the Pittsburgh Bureau of Police
Year of birth missing
Year of death missing
Place of birth missing
Place of death missing